Hwanghae Line (黄海線, Kōkai-sen) was the name given by the privately owned Chōsen Railway of colonial Korea to its network of railway lines in Hwanghae Province. The name encompassed the mainline from Sariwon to Haeju, along with several connecting branch lines.

History
The first section of what would become the Hwanghae Line was a   narrow-gauge line from Sanghae (later Samgang) to Naeto via Hwasan opened by the Mitsubishi Ironworks on 20 May 1919 for use as a private industrial railway. Shortly thereafter, the West Chōsen Development Railway was set up to take over this line, which it did on 21 April of the following year.

On 1 April 1923, the West Chōsen Development Railway merged with five other railway companies to form the Chōsen Railway (abbreviated Chōtetsu, to distinguish it from the Chōsen Government Railway, which was known as Sentetsu), taking over all lines and operations of its predecessors. Chōtetsu then grouped the Sanghae—Naeto line together with the Sariwon—Sanghae—Sincheon line it had inherited from the West Chōsen Development Railway, collectively calling them the Hwanghae Line.

Chōtetsu subsequently expanded the Hwanghae Line network significantly, with the first expansion being the  addition to extend the line from Hwasan to Miryeok, opening the new track on 1 September 1924. A year to the day later Chōtetsu opened the  Miryeok—Sinwon—Haseong line.

The network remained unchanged over the following four years, but after that there came a flurry of expansions. First, the Sariwon–Sincheon line was extended  from Sincheon to Sugyo on 1 November 1929, followed on 12 November 1929 by the  extension Sinwon—Hakhyeon section, and on 11 December 1930 by the  Hakhyeon—East Haeju section. Less than a year later, Chōtetsu extended the line again, this time with a  segment from East Haeju to Haeju Port station in Ryongdangp'o. 

Chōtetsu then began expanding its network around Haeju. First, a  line from East Haeju to Haeju Port at Ryongdangp'o was opened on 12 November 1931, after which construction began eastwards from Haeju to create a southern connection to the Gyeongui Line, the state-owned Chōsen Government Railway's main line from Gyeongseong to Sinuiju and on to Andong, Manchukuo. The first section of this new narrow gauge line, from East Haeju to Yeon'an, was opened on 21 December 1931. 

The second section involved much more intensive work, as a bridge had to be built across the Ryesong River. Thirty-five girders were supplied by Japanese locomotive manufacturer Kisha Seizō, and the line was finally opened on 1 September 1932, running from Yeon'an across the new bridge to connect to the Gyeongui Line at Toseong (later renamed Gaepung). A  extension west from East Haeju to Haeju was opened on 1 July 1933.

Expansion then headed west from Haeju, with a  stretch of new line from Haeju to Chwiya that was opened on 11 December 1936. The northwestern area was not left ignored, as just over a month later, a  extension from Sugyo to Jangyeon was opened on 21 January 1937. Finally, on 10 May 1937 a  branch was opened from Dongpo to Jeongdo,  followed by a  extension from Chwiya to Ongjin nine days later.

Chōtetsu sold the Hwanghae Line network to Sentetsu on 1 April 1944, which absorbed the Hwanghae Line network and split it up, giving each section a new name:
 Cheongdan–Deokdal → Deokdal Line
 Sinwon–Haseong → Haseong Line
 Samgang–Jangyeon → Jangyeon Line
 Dongpo–Jeongdo → Jeongdo Line
 Hwasan–Naeto → Naeto Line
 Haeju–Ongjin → Ongjin Line
 Sariwon—Hwasan—Sinwŏn—Haeju → Sahae Line
 East Haeju–Toseong → Tohae Line

Deciding that traffic levels merited the construction of a standard gauge line, Sentetsu built a new,  line from Sariwon to Haseong, calling it the Hwanghae Main Line. The opening of a new station in Haseong led to the existing station on the narrow gauge line from Sinwon to be renamed "Guhaseong Station" ("Old Haseong Station").

After the end of the Pacific War and the subsequent partition of Korea, most of the former Hwanghae Line network was located in North Korea and was taken over by the Korean State Railway. However, most of the Tohae Line was located in the US zone of occupation that later became South Korea, with the line being divided along the 38th Parallel between Jangbang and Galsan, and the Korean National Railroad operated passenger trains on the line between Tosŏng and Ch'ŏngdan until 1950. After the end of the Korean War, the entirety of the former Hwanghae Line network was within North Korea.

Services

In the November 1942 timetable, the last issued prior to the start of the Pacific War, Chōtetsu operated an extensive schedule of third-class-only local passenger services:

Routes

References

Rail transport in North Korea
Rail transport in South Korea
Rail transport in Korea
Korea under Japanese rule
Defunct railway companies of Japan
Defunct railway companies of Korea
Chosen Railway